United Stars Football Club is an association football team in Rundu, Namibia. They played in the Namibia Premier League from 2009–10.

References

Football clubs in Namibia
Rundu